Lubochnia  is a village in Tomaszów Mazowiecki County, Łódź Voivodeship, in central Poland. It is the seat of the gmina, the principal unit of administrative division in Poland, called Gmina Lubochnia.

The village has a population of 684.

References

Villages in Tomaszów Mazowiecki County
Piotrków Governorate
Łódź Voivodeship (1919–1939)